Chegongzhuangxi is a station on Line 6 of the Beijing Subway. This station opened on December 30, 2012.

Station Layout 
The station has an underground island platform.

Exits 
There are 4 exits, lettered A, B, C, and D. Exits A and C are accessible.

Gallery

References

Railway stations in China opened in 2012
Beijing Subway stations in Xicheng District